Science and Islam (2009) is a three-part BBC documentary about the history of science in medieval Islamic civilization presented by Jim Al-Khalili. The series is accompanied by the book Science and Islam: A History written by Ehsan Masood.

Episodes 

 "The Language of Science"
 "The Empire of Reason"
 "The Power of Doubt"

Interviews 

The documentary contains several short segments with scientists and historians of science:

 George Saliba
 Simon Schaffer
 Peter Pormann (medicine)
 Amira K. Bennison
 Okasha El Daly (egyptology)
 Ian Stewart (algebra)
 Nader El-Bizri

See also
 List of Islamic films

External links 
 
 
 "The Language of Science"
 "The Empire of Reason"
 "The Power of Doubt"
"Medieval Islam Influences", Reel Truth Science Documentaries.
"Ibn al-Haytham & Optics", Reel Truth Science Documentaries.
"Islamic Knowledge", Reel Truth Science Documentaries. 

BBC television documentaries about history
Historical television series
English-language television shows
British documentary television series
BBC television documentaries about science
2009 British television series debuts
2009 British television series endings
2009 in science
Science in the medieval Islamic world
2009 in Islam